Sancovade is a town of the Vilalba District, in Galicia, Spain.  Its name translates as "Saint Cucuphas" (San Cobad, San Covade).

Geography
In Sancovade, birch trees line the banks of the river Fabilos, where there are beautiful meadows and valleys.

Festivals
The town celebrates the days of the Apostle Santiago of Guadalupe, in the chapel of Our Lady of Guadalupe and St. Anthony.

Sources
Vilalba.org: Parroquia de Sancobad 
La Voz de Galicia: "Sancobade es la parroquia más poblada de toda la comarca", 30 December 2007 

Populated places in the Province of Lugo